The Keating House at 208 South Liberty Street in Centreville, Maryland is a Federal style house built c. 1806-1809 by Ebenezer Covington. The interior is particularly well-preserved.

The house was listed on the National Register of Historic Places in 1999.

References

External links 
 , including photo in 1981, at Maryland Historical Trust

Houses on the National Register of Historic Places in Maryland
Federal architecture in Maryland
Greek Revival houses in Maryland
Houses in Queen Anne's County, Maryland
Houses completed in 1809
National Register of Historic Places in Queen Anne's County, Maryland